Darryl Brown may refer to:

 Darryl Brown (South African cricketer) (born 1983)
 Darryl Brown (West Indian cricketer) (born 1973)
 Darryl Brown, drummer for Weather Report from July through December 1974